Chiau Wen-yan (: born 17 July 1953) is a Taiwanese politician. He was the member of Legislative Yuan, a professor and the former director of the Institute of Marine Affairs and Resource Management at National Taiwan Ocean University.

Education and specialities
Chiau Wen-yan received his M.A. (1989) and Ph.D. (1991) from the University of Pennsylvania, U.S. after earning his B.S. (1976) and LL.M. (1980) degrees in Taiwan. He was honored with the 2015 National Cheng Kung University Distinguished Alumni Award in November 2015 and the Lifetime Contribution Award by the Taiwan Institute of Landscape Architects in January 2016.  Chiau's specialties are environmental planning and management, especially with regard to the areas of city and regional planning, climate change, coastal zone management, wetland conservation, ecotourism, underwater heritage, ocean policies and environmental law. In fact, Chiau drafted Taiwan's Environmental Education Act, which was passed in 2010. In 1995 and again in 2001, the Canadian Trade Office in Taipei honored him with the Canadian Studies Award for his research on coastal zone management and marine protected areas in Canada. Chiau served as a representative of the Chinese Taipei delegation in the APEC Working Group Meeting on Marine Resource Conservation and Fisheries, which led to the common APEC journals for the Marine Resource Conservation Working Group and the Fisheries Working Group. He also held the post of editor of the international journal Ocean and Coastal Management.

As an oceanographer, Chiau has drafted such marine blueprints as the "Vision of Maritime Countries" in 1996, the "Maritime Affairs Organization Prospectus" in 2000, the "Ocean White Paper" in 2001, the "National Vision for the Golden Decade" concerning the ocean and wetlands protection policy in 2002, the "Ocean Policy White Paper" in 2006, the "Ocean Education White Paper" in 2007, and the "Blue Revolution and Ocean Nation" policy in 2008. Chiau and Huang Huang-hsiung hosted the "Ocean and Taiwan Seminar" three consecutive times. Chiau also participated in rescuing the Free China Junk. 
Chiau was appointed the deputy director of the Environmental Protection Administration, Executive Yuan in August 2008. In 2011, he was nominated and ranked fifth by the Kuomintang Party as the 2012 legislator-at-large in November 2011.  Furthermore, Chiau was appointed as the President of "R.O.C. Parliamentary Association for Friendship with Germany" established in the Legislative Yuan on June 10, 2015.

Chiau advocates environmental sustainability and landscape and cultural heritage preservation and has also urged developing electronic maritime charts to maintain navigation safety. Meanwhile, he advocates relevant countries to be self-restrained regarding disputes over the East China Sea and South China Sea. He recommends upholding the concept of "peace" and "marine protected zones" so that Taiwan, China and Japan can temporarily put their dispute aside and negotiate with the "International Marine Peace Park" that is constructed jointly in the East China Sea and the South China Sea.

Work History
Academia 
Chiau previously served as a professor and the director of the Institute of Marine Affairs and Resource Management, National Taiwan Ocean University. He is currently an associate professor in the Department of Marine Environment and Engineering at National Sun Yat-sen University.

Government 
Chiau's participation in the Taiwanese government has consisted of the following posts:
8th term of legislator-at-large,
Deputy Minister of Environmental Protection Administration, 
Member, Commission on Marine Education, Ministry of Education
Council Member, National Council for Marine Affairs Advancement, Executive Yuan Cabinet)
Member, Commission on Research and Planning, Taiwan Coast Guard Administration, Executive Yuan (Cabinet)
Advisor, Advisory Commission on National Land Conservation and Development of the Presidential Hall
Council Member, National Council for Sustainable Development, Executive Yuan (Cabinet)
Advisor, Committee for Sustainable Development, Legislative Yuan (Congress) Member, Committee on Environmental Impact Assessment, Penghu County Government
Advisor, Kaohsiung County Government
Advisor, Kaohsiung City Government
Advisor, Pingtung County Government
Member, Advisory Commission on Wildlife Conservation, Council of Agriculture, Executive Yuan (Cabinet)
Delegate of Chinese Taipei, APEC Marine Resource Conservation Working Group
Senior Specialist, Construction and Planning Administration, Ministry of the Interior.

NGOs 
He is also involved in non-governmental organizations (NGOs) in the following capacities:
CEO, Foundation of Ocean Taiwan
President, Taiwan Association of Marine Pollution Control
President, Wetlands Taiwan
Board Member, Asia Environmental Council – Asia-Pacific NGOs Environmental.

Major Bills
《The Environmental Education Act 》
This act Officially passed after the third reading on May 18, 2010, this act focuses on nationwide participation, lifelong learning and environmental education with the overall integration of science and technology and sets forth a thorough cure for Taiwan's environmental problems and worldwide climate change.

《The Wetland Conservation Act》
It Officially passed on June 18, 2013, and becoming effective on February 2, 2015 (Wetland Day), this act advocates a wholehearted effort to protect wetland ecology and its diversified, comprehensive and multifaceted culture and biology, featuring the concepts of "intelligent utilization" and "zero impairment". It also regulates the definition of wetland and any changes or revocation of a wetland and includes a plan for conservation and utilization, development prevention, compensation for wetlands, wetland funds, penalty clauses and the like.

《The Organization Act of the Council of Indigenous Peoples》
It Officially passed on January 14, 2014, this act sets forth that the nation and the government should appreciate and preserve the indigenous people's religious beliefs, ritual ceremonies, languages, culture and cultural assets, both tangible and intangible. The act further advocates the integration of policies towards indigenous peoples, the protection of their ethnic rights and increased public power over the affairs of the indigenous peoples. The "Organization Act of the Council of Indigenous Peoples" has been duly promulgated.

《The Coastal Zone Management Act》
This act Officially passed on January 20, 2015, enforcing this act is aimed at ending the "Meiliwan resort development project" nightmare. Although passing this act required 25 years of hard work, Chiau has pointed out that this new act is only a partial solution to the problem. Taiwanese people are calling for continued efforts to create a National Territory Planning Act, as well as for national-level marine planning. Much of the serious damage to the coast often does not originate on the coast itself. For instance, the severe deterioration of the west coastline has been caused by the building of reservoirs on virtually every upstream water-head of each and every tributary. The "Coastal Zone Management Act" is the second of three National Territory Acts. Implementing the act involves defining "Coastal Regions" and determining an "Overall Coast Management Plan" to safeguard against disasters. Furthermore, its implementation means new methods for sustainable utilization, the protection of natural habitats and cultural assets, secure landscape visions, guarding the coasts against shore disasters, safeguarding public passage and public utilization, and preservation of indigenous peoples, their villages and their cultures. A "Coast Management Fund" shall be set up and protection and restoration will be encouraged.

《Amendment of the Forestry Act - Chapter on Tree Protection》
The Amendment of the Forestry Act added Article 3–1, title of Chapter 5–1, Articles 38-2~38-6 and 47-1 and revised Articles 1 and 56.Officially passed on June 12, 2015, the Amendment advocates a Tree Doctor System. The original "Forest Act" offered preservation efforts only to trees in the mountains and forests, but lacked a sound policy regarding trees on the plains, those in urban planning areas or areas beyond urban planning. As a result, there have been a number of cases of unjustifiable trimming and felling. With the present amendment, a special chapter for all Tree Protection has been added to upgrade the quality of overall tree protection. The new amendment emphasizes that local level government sought to conduct tree censuses within their individual jurisdictions. Large, old or important trees should not be arbitrarily felled, transplanted, trimmed or otherwise damaged. In addition to maintaining sound growth environments, local governments ought to provide accurate information and launch a means of tracing and supervision. Other competent government authorities will develop and publish necessary technical and executive specifications. The added chapter also sets forth provisions for ecological compensation, as well as incentives and penalties. This amendment provides Taiwan with the ability to take the necessary steps to enact the special chapter that refers to the training, cultivation, examination, screening, grading and motivation of professionals and technical personnel, as well as provides a suitable authentication system.

《The Museum Act》
The Museum Act was officially passed at the third reading on June 15, 2015. Chiau attributes this successful enactment to Han Pao-teh, Chang Yu-Teng and other enthusiastic proponents of the drafting of their First Version. The proposal by Chiau Wen-yan, a student of Han Pao-teh, included Museum research, repair, regular exhibitions, grading, classification, self-appraisal, marketing, virtual museums, the indigenous people's museum, and a provision for forfeiture of incentive awards in case of failure to comply.

《The Greenhouse Gas Reduction & Management Act》
This act was officially passed on June 15, 2015. Chiau held that over the past decade, significant advances in climate change controls have been achieved worldwide. "Carbon reduction" is now a widespread international trend. While many nations have enacted laws that require products to be labeled green or low carbon, Taiwan is subject to extreme and serious pressure as a foreign trade-oriented nation. With the passage of three different legislations, political changes and numerous disputes, the Greenhouse Gas Reduction and Management Act was finally passed after its third reading. This act focuses on a long-term carbon reduction target set below 50% of the 2005 level by the year 2050, but grants flexibility for adjustments in accordance with domestic and international trends. Government authorities will prepare an agenda for action against climate change, as well as for carbon reduction in greenhouse gases. In addition to this act, sound consideration shall also be given to environmental protection, the economic development and dignity of society, total quantity control (total mass) and efficiency criteria, the implementation of inventories, review and verification, a registry system of discharges and a related quota, offsets, auctions, rationing sales and trading systems. Furthermore, the government shall encourage innovative research and development, the implementation of low carbon green growth and low carbon labeling systems.

The Four Organizational Acts of the Council of Marine Affairs, Coast Guard Administration, Marine Conservation Administration, and the National Academy for Ocean Research
They Officially passed on June 16, 2015, these four acts govern marine and coastal affairs, including fisheries, navigation, recreation, preservation, pollution control, security, defense and education. As always, Chiau stressed the necessity for a very definite competent authority responsible for marine affairs. Currently, several different departments are responsible for marine resources. In case of an emergency, an Inter-Agency Task Force is required to take charge of the situation, while an ad hoc unit is required to properly establish planning and management prior to any emergencies. Lin Ai-Lung, chairman of the Board of the Oceanus Honors Gaia, pointed out that this would be a brand new agency in our government, suggesting that Taiwan is now marching toward a new era that visualizes a fresh and sustainable environment in the 21st century.

《The Underwater Cultural Heritage Conservation Act》
This act Officially passed on November 24, 2015. It advocates effective preservation, protection and management of rich, submerged cultural heritage in the surrounding waters of the Republic of China and aims to fulfill the spirit endorsed by the UNESCO Convention on the Protection of Underwater Cultural Heritage, 2001.

《National Land Use Planning  Act》
It was passed via three readings on December 18, 2015, which will be divided by national land conservation, rural development, agricultural development and marine assets such four major functions.  The goals are to ensure the safety of national land as corresponded with climate change, conserve natural and cultural assets, promote reasonable industrial allocation, reinforce integrated management of national land, restore damaged national land, pursue proper land for proper use and sustainable national development.  In addition to the establishment of environmental sensitivity information, overall operation for national land development institutions and national land restoration, it also pays full respect to the intelligence and interests of indigenous people.

Chiau also participated in the deliberation process of《Special Statute for the Comprehensive Management of River Basins》, which was officially passed on January 14, 2014. This statute encompasses the key issues throughout all the national territories, with overall planning of up, mid and downstream waters. Chiau advocates and stresses that the watercourses can be controlled by both subtle and rigid means to increase permeation spaces and those of retention basins or green areas. With comprehensive watercourse controls, measures against climate change can be employed with the assistance of public participation to prepare plans and determine the optimal means for future watercourse control. In Taiwan, an island regularly suffering from either floods or drought, the focus shall not be solely on watercourse control, but rather the creation of a "water conservation oriented society" with introspective national land planning and water resource management that will not accept a single moment's delay.

Furthermore, Chiau believes that the relevant provisions for urban renewal infringe upon human rights and override the protection of human rights set down in the Constitution, as well as the protection of property. Taiwan is lacking overall planning and concern for the preservation, protection and management of submarine cultural assets and interest in the conflict of the utilization of marine resources. Chiau also plants to address the damage and collapse of national land and landscapes in the future. Other of Chiau's acts include the《Amendment of Urban Renewal Act》, the《Landscape Bill》, the《Landscape Architect Bill》, the《Marine Area Management Bill》, the《Amendment of Cultural Heritage Preservation Act》, and the《Indigenous Peoples’ Land and Marine Area Bill》.

Anecdote
When Chiau was a student at the National Cheng Kung University, he served as President of the Fine Art Club, and learned after Professor Guo Bai-chuan (郭柏川) for sketching, Professor Ma Den-Fieu (馬電飛) for watercolor painting, Professor Tsai Mao-song (蔡茂松) for traditional Chinese painting, and Professor Wang Jia-cheng (王家誠) for design. Chiau has won the first prizes in both college group and social group in the "Ink Painting and Sketching Competition in Southern Taiwan’s Seven Counties," with the works collected in Tainan Social Education Center. Chiau has also won the first prize (Golden Ring Award) in the traditional Chinese painting category of the national "Qingxi Literature and Art Award" for the military reserve force. Some of his ballpoint pen drawings are preserved in [Chiau Wen-yan's Travel Essays].

See also

 List of Legislative Yuan members elected in the Republic of China legislative election, 2012

References

1953 births
Living people
Kuomintang Members of the Legislative Yuan in Taiwan
Party List Members of the Legislative Yuan
University of Pennsylvania alumni